The American animated television series Grim & Evil created by Maxwell Atoms for Cartoon Network. It consists of two segments which were eventually spun off into their own series, The Grim Adventures of Billy & Mandy and Evil Con Carne.

The Grim Adventures of Billy & Mandy follows two children, a dimwitted yet well-meaning boy named Billy (voiced by Richard Steven Horvitz) and a brilliant yet sinister girl named Mandy (voiced by Grey DeLisle). After winning a limbo game to save Billy's pet hamster, the two gain The Grim Reaper (voiced by Greg Eagles) as their best friend for eternity and come across many supernatural or otherworldly characters and locations throughout the series.

Its sister show, Evil Con Carne, follows the brain of a playboy who wants to rule the world with his general Skarr and his lover, Major Doctor Ghastly. Since Hector Con Carne is attached to a bear named Boskov, Hector wants to find the rest of his body parts and take over the world.

The Grim Adventures of Billy & Mandy

Main characters

Billy 

William "Billy" is an 10-year-old human boy who strangely has a low IQ of -5, a sign of intellectual disability, having been outperformed by a shovel and two candy bracelets on an IQ test, though he acts like a smart-aleck. He has a big, pink nose and beady, black eyes inherited from his father, Harold, and red hair inherited from his mother, Gladys. His main affiliations are Grim and Mandy. Mandy is Billy's best friend, though she treats him more like a servant than a friend. It has been hinted several times that Billy may have underlying feelings for Mandy that even he (in his stupidity) may not fully realize. Billy is far kinder to Grim than Mandy is, and while he almost always goes against the Saton's advice and uses him as a plaything, he appears to genuinely like him and often tells Grim that he's his "best friend".

Due to Billy's foolish desires, which he orders Grim to bring about, he is often the cause of Grim and Mandy's mishaps. Although good-natured and well-behaved, he has occasional fits of stubbornness and rage, which shows insanity that even Mandy seems to fear. Billy is the most innocent character of the three, yet he ends up causing the most problems due to his irrational and often impulsive choice of actions. He has a wide curiosity which gets him into situations he often can't get himself out of without Grim and Mandy coming to his rescue. Billy is also scared of spiders, which is quite unfortunate because a huge Spider named Jeff believes that Billy is his "father". His greatest fears were combined by Horror's Hand into a monstrous clown-spider-mailman hybrid in the Big Boogey Adventure movie.

In Underfist, the origin of his fear of spiders is shown through in a flashback. A yellow marshmallow bunny named Bun-Bun used to sneak into Billy's room when he was a baby and tormented him with real spiders. This is explained by Bun-Bun during the flashback so as to torment Jeffery about his problems with his dad.

Billy's family is Harold (his father), Gladys (his mother), Nergal (his uncle), Aunt Sis (his aunt), Nergal Jr. (his cousin), and his grandmother, who lives in the Netherworld (for reasons unknown). He is also good friends with Lana and, occasionally, with Jollien, however his best friends are Mandy and Irwin.  During the end credits of Billy & Mandy Save Christmas, Billy mentions that his family celebrates Hanukkah ("that way we gets more presents"). However, from the way Billy says it implies that they celebrate it as an excuse to get more presents suggesting that they may not actually be Jewish.

In 2021, Maxwell Atoms, who has Asperger syndrome himself, confirmed that Billy is autistic and likened him to "the fun and joyous inner-world where [Atoms likes] to spend [his] time" in contrast to Mandy.

Mandy 

Amanda "Mandy" is an 10-year-old human girl with a sinister, manipulative nature despite her appearance. She lives with her father, Phil, and mother, Claire. Mandy is thoroughly emotionless; however, has sometimes been touched in a few scenarios, such as at one point when Billy was thought to be dead and Mandy's reaction appeared quite nervous and partially mournful. She also possesses a strong lust for power as revealed in an episode providing insight to the future of the town of Endsville, in which Mandy has enslaved all of its citizens and evolved herself into a large, anthropomorphic being resembling a giant caterpillar (a reference to the Dune series), and Grim's abilities have helped her gain access to satisfaction of her desires. Oddly, though, she keeps Billy as her companion and makes clones of him whenever he is killed accidentally due to his stupidity. Mandy has been known to domineer everybody around her without fear, and the few things that she likes include junk food, television, and all things dark and melancholy. She also does not appear to have a visible nose, which has been pointed out a few times throughout the series.

Throughout the series, Mandy rarely smiles, and her facial expression remains perpetually disgruntled. Mandy smiling is shown to be the end of the world; in the episode "My Fair Mandy", after entering a local beauty contest against the queen bee of her classroom, it was revealed that all of reality would be humorously, psychedelically distorted, resulting in the series swapping premises with that of The Powerpuff Girls, another Cartoon Network animated series. Despite this, Mandy is seen to crack an evil sneer at the end of a few episodes, such as when she becomes the only person left on Earth, and after winning the contest which gave her a servant in Grim. Mandy mostly never smiles, because Maxwell Atoms' parents used to call him "the Little Russian Boy who Never Smiles", which only encouraged him to smile even less. Despite this, Mandy has smiled in some episodes, such as "Meet the Reaper", "Opposite Day", "Look Alive!", "A Dumb Wish", "Something Stupid This Way Comes", "Tickle Me Mandy" (via title card), "Crushed", "Mandy the Merciless", "Five-O-Clock Shadows" (though it was only her shadow self), "My Peeps", "Test of Time", "Scythe for Sale", (almost), "Billy & Mandy Begins", "My Fair Mandy", "Billy & Mandy Save Christmas", "Heartburn", and the TV movie Billy & Mandy's Big Boogey Adventure, where she (even barely) does crack a smile.

Mandy also despises Billy's best friend Irwin, who is strongly infatuated with her, and it was revealed in the Big Boogey Adventure that one of her worst nightmares would be to grow into an obese, kind woman marrying a handsome version of Irwin. Her other deepest fear was shown in the episode Heartburn where she feared losing her true heart after hearing Irwin's sad story about how he was originally born to be a really bad boy, but then experienced a change of heart after his father showed him how to love and respect other people. This caused her to seriously doubt if she could withstand a change of heart and at the thought of just losing it, caused her to scream really loudly out loud. She is also scared of an extremely angry Billy and will run from him when need be. Billy says that she never smiles in her life, which is false.

In 2021, Maxwell Atoms, who has Asperger syndrome himself, confirmed that Mandy is autistic and likened her to "the cold, rational way [he] learned to view the world in order to survive" in contrast to Billy.

The Grim Reaper 

Evergrimskull "Grim" Death a.k.a. The Grim Reaper is the personification of death and a grumpy and neurotic skeleton wearing a black, hooded cloak and armed with a scythe, who serves as a psychopomp between the realms of the living and the deceased. Grim was born around 137,000 years ago at the time of the Stone Age and speaks with a Jamaican accent. The continuity of how Grim got his reaper status and tremendously strong and powerful supernatural powers comes up quite a few times and it is unknown which way he really got his supernatural powers (for example, in The Wrath of the Spider Queen movie, he was elected to his position as the Grim Reaper back while he was in middle school; however, in A Grim Prophecy, it is shown that he was the Grim Reaper since his childhood with his parents forcing him to be the Reaper, which is further contradicted in a later episode where he is seen stumbling over his scythe to become the Grim Reaper). His long scythe is the source of nearly all his supernatural abilities, and possesses many magical capabilities and qualities; although he is still capable of using some incredibly powerful magic spells without it, these instances are quite rare.

By losing a limbo contest to Billy and Mandy after they cheated, Grim is fated to be their "best friend" forever. Unfortunately for the Reaper, the contract legally binds him to them, such that (as revealed in the episode "Hurter Monkey") if he were to ever break his friendship with them prematurely, he would be forced to spend eternity in Underworld Jail (something he doesn't relish the idea of, as he doesn't know what kind of inmates lurk there) as a result of violating his contract. Despite this however, he has often tried various ways to get out of this servitude (in the Big Boogey Adventure, Boogey notes this as "invalidating a legal and binding contract"). Though Billy is friendly towards him, Mandy treats him dominantly, and this angers and irritates him to the point where he constantly fantasizes about killing both of them. However, there have been instances that show that he does indeed care for them. He is often forced to do their chores and create supernatural fun for them. Grim is slowly adapting to modern life and is usually seen in his free time watching television (mainly horror movies or soap operas). His adaptation to daily life also leads him to neglect his duties as a Master of the Underworld and, eventually, not even care about who uses his enormously powerful scythe, seeing as how it is constantly stolen. He also has a bottomless trunk, where all types of dark magical and mystical objects are found; Billy usually abuses them, creating extensive damage, chaos, ruin, death, and destruction.

His love-and-hate relationship with Billy and Mandy seems to vary from each other. He seems to be more annoyed with Billy than Mandy, due to his idiocy and stupidity. Although Billy abuses Grim's magical and supernatural powers as much as Mandy, Billy treats Grim with much more fairness, generosity, and kindness, resulting in Grim actually caring and liking Billy. In Mandy's case, although they both share the same cold-hearted cynical and misanthropic view of humanity and apathy for the welfare of Billy and other characters, Grim tends to dislike her more than Billy due to her abusive, cruel and disrespectful actions towards him. Like most other characters, Grim greatly is afraid of Mandy, but is able to openly rebel against her when she becomes too obnoxious and abusive.

Grim owns the giant three-headed dog Cerberus but has no control over it whatsoever and is terrified of it. Mandy seems to be the only person capable of taming and commanding it effectively. He is immune to the effects of Horror's Hand as he already lives his greatest fear everyday living with Billy and Mandy, but he stated he turned it off upon obtaining it, so there may be something he fears more.

While it is shown that Grim does care for his scythe, he often makes the mistake of letting Billy (and in rare instances Mandy and Irwin) use it, or loses it in other ways. In "Billy and Mandy's Jacked-Up Halloween", Grim let Billy use his scythe as an accessory for his costume, only to have it stolen by Jack O'Lantern, who as it turns out is an old enemy of Grim's. Another element to the show is how characters from Grim's past often show up and often take revenge on him for what he had done to them over the centuries or millennia.

In 2021, Maxwell Atoms, who has Asperger syndrome himself, confirmed that Grim is autistic and likened him to "the moral mediator" between the aspects of Atoms represented by Billy and Mandy.

Irwin Dracula 

Irwin Dracula is a pudgy, nerdy boy and a close friend of Billy's. He says the word "yo" regularly. Unlike Mandy and Billy, who show no signs of fear for the frightening, supernatural and magical beings and settings around them when using Grim's magic to venture into the underworld (Mandy because of her fearless yet sinister personality and Billy because of his ignorance and stupidity), Irwin has displayed more signs of cowardice in such situations and seems to be more easily terrified than his friends when he accompanies them on such trips (such as in Big Boogey Adventure and Keeper of the Reaper). In one episode, it was revealed that Irwin's mother is a mummy (as is his maternal grandfather) and that his paternal grandfather is the bloodthirsty Dracula, who is married to Irwin's saucy paternal grandmother Tanya.

Because of being related to such peculiar monsters, Irwin has been shown to possess superpowers which he displayed basically just in a single episode. In Underfist, when using his newly discovered powers Bun-Bun and Mindy remark in a very impressed way that Irwin's supernatural abilities and dark powers are truly amazing. He is also famous for his deep romantic infatuation with Mandy, in spite of her hatred of him. His deepest fear is shown in Big Boogey Adventure: telling jokes to wild bears.

In rare instances Irwin is shown to have an evil, darker and power-hungry side to his personality. In the episode called Halls of Time, it is mentioned by Irwin that he has an older brother named Melvin who picks on him so much that when they get a hold of Melvin's hourglass, Irwin destroys it while laughing in an evil manner. In another episode after Irwin's mummy grandpa shows up to commission a pyramid for his grandson, Irwin first agrees to it because of impressing Mandy, but later gives in to it after developing a very strong taste for power. He then shows his more sinister side when enslaving all of the people of Endsville and zombifying them. In another episode, Irwin uses Grim's scythe to make Mandy into his love-slave and he even mentions that he knows that is wrong, but he quickly disregards this fact. He then really enjoys his power over Mandy's mind and when Grim and Billy try to take back the scythe, Irwin doesn't give up without a good fight. This very rare darker side of his personality was finally explained in the series' last episode called Heartburn. In it, Mandy discovers everyone's true heart through the use of Grim's special camera, but is greatly shocked when she discovers that one side of Irwin's heart looks like hers in a very creepy way. Irwin explains that he was born evil, but had a change of heart when his father showed him the meaning of respect, friendship, and love.

Supporting characters

Billy's family 
 Harold (voiced by Richard Steven Horvitz) is Billy's equally dimwitted and idiotic father, Aunt Sis' brother, Nergal's brother-in-law, Nergal Jr.'s maternal uncle, and Gladys's husband. He is a fat man with a large, bulbous nose and a lofty black pompadour. Harold resembles his son in appearance and personality, sometimes displaying even more stupidity than Billy himself. Harold's employment is unknown and varies from episode to episode (he reveals in the Big Boogey Adventure that he gets fired all the time, for even the smallest of dumb acts). Despite his low IQ, Harold was accepted in Harvard and was a former Navy Seal. Harold is also known to be afraid of Santa Claus. Harold was very intelligent and laid-back in the Grim & Evil era, but has grown in stupidity as the series progressed.
 Gladys (voiced by Jennifer Hale) is Billy's mother, Aunt Sis' sister-in-law and Harold's wife. She is a loving, tolerant, and patient, yet mentally unstable woman. This is brought on by having to deal with her family, and Grim as an eternal guest. Gladys has reddish-orange hair and is usually seen wearing a floor-length lavender dress, and red shoes. She considers Grim a constant threat to her son's safety. In multiple instances, Gladys is seen attacking Grim to protect her son. She has a severe facial tic, which usually appears when Billy is misbehaving, when her authority is challenged, or whenever Grim is present, and has also developed nervous breakdowns. Despite so, Gladys cares deeply for Billy and Harold, although when Harold gets fired for doing something so stupid or whenever Billy is really disobeying her or acting up, she does have large outbursts of rage. She wants Billy to grow up to be a chiropractor, even though she knows that is very unlikely to happen. She is prone to small fits of insanity and obsessive-compulsive episodes. Because of all of the stress caused by Billy, Harold, Grim and, to a lesser extent, Mandy, Gladys is the only character in the series to demonstrate having more control over herself when Mandy uses her own strong willpower. It is possible that she has passed on her mental instability to her son Billy who has shown similar outbursts of rage and insanity.
 Milkshakes (voiced by Grey DeLisle) is Billy's endearing pink pet cat. In spite of his lack of significance in the series, on a couple of occasions he has played a key role; his body has been overtaken supernaturally on two occasions in the past; once by an intellectual tutoring spirit known as a bookworm to help Billy in school and on the other instance by an enraged, vindictive Mandy, whose body had been possessed by a clowning Billy earlier in the episode.
 Nergal (voiced by David Warner (2001–2002); Martin Jarvis (2003–2008)) is a black-skinned supernatural devil with green eyes who is the god of war and wears a business suit. He is loosely based on the Mesopotamian deity of the same name. With the ability to shapeshift, he can create several tentacles from his back that can electrocute his victims or turn them into beings looking like himself. What Nergal desires most is having friends, once stating that it is quite lonely in the center of the world. He is generally considered something of a loser and he often becomes histrionic over his failings. In his first appearances, Nergal was one of the main enemies of Billy, Mandy, and Grim, but now as a member of Billy's family because he married Billy's Aunt Sis, he is a friend of them and Billy's uncle by marriage. As being given the Hell-like nature of his realm, which is the Underworld, Nergal is also based on Satan. Nergal is also the brother-in-law of Harold.
 Aunt Sis (voiced by Grey DeLisle) is Harold's sister, Gladys' sister-in-law, Billy's paternal aunt, Nergal's wife, and Nergal Jr.'s human mother. She is a sullen-looking woman with glasses, a large nose, and a hairstyle similar to Gladys. She was a spinster who had experienced four-and-a-half-minutes of love in her "pathetic, lonely life" before finally finding her match in the equally-lonely demon Nergal.
 Nergal Jr. "Junior" (voiced by Debi Derryberry) is the son of Nergal and Billy's aunt Sis, and Harold's nephew. He is also Billy's first cousin. He looks more like his father than his mother. Like his father, he has the power to shapeshift and most of the time he appears in the form of a kid who rejected his offer of friendship when he first came to the surface. When he takes another shape, he keeps his lime eyes, glasses, green tongue, and sharp, light green teeth. It is revealed in the episode "Son of Nergal" that his true form resembled a hideous black octopus-like creature, which is rather blobbish in shape. Like his father, he is lonely and can't find friends, and because of his desperation, he developed evil tendencies and terrorizes everyone who stands in his way, except for Billy and Mandy. An example of this is the fact that he froze people with supernatural powers, trapping them into ice, captures Sperg, and made him his "pet" and sticking his teacher to the ceiling. However, he does form a close friendship with Billy, Mandy, and Irwin later in the series, and even showed a little affection towards Mandy and asking her to the school dance.

Mandy's family 
 Phillip "Phil" (voiced by Dee Bradley Baker) is Mandy's father. Like Claire, he is very afraid of Mandy and she seems to have a mental control over him. He and Claire are the only known relatives that Mandy has. He wears a white shirt, dark-yellow glasses and grey pants. Not much else is known about him because he does not appear in the series often. In Keeper Of The Reaper, he did state in court that when Mandy was born, wolves came and tried to take her as their own, but he sometimes wonders if they were right to stop them.
 Claire (voiced by Vanessa Marshall) is Mandy's mother. She, like her husband, is also terrified of her daughter and does not appear that much in the series. She wears a red-striped sweater and gray pants. In a few early episodes however, Claire is seen giving orders to Mandy whenever the house gets dirty and in Keeper Of The Reaper is seen trying to love Mandy after she was born and admits that she and her husband love Mandy very much.
 Saliva (voiced by Jess Harnell, later Richard Horvitz) Mandy's pet dog. He drools a lot, thus his name. He appears here and there, as well in the theme song along with Milkshakes and Mr. Snuggles, even though Mandy is disgusted and annoyed with him, she does care about him.

Irwin's family 
 Richard "Dick" Dracula (voiced by Phil LaMarr) is Irwin's father. He is a middle-aged Dhampir (half-human and half-vampire), but he is never referred to as a vampire. Dick ends a lot of his sentences with the word "dude". He is married to a mummy named Judy, who is Irwin's mother and due to her being a mummy makes Irwin half-mummy, one quarter human and one quarter vampire. Irwin's father insists that their unusual pairing leaves "a lot of questions that don't need to be answered." Dick is also known for having a 1970s taste in style and sometimes gives Irwin really bad dating and attracting girls advice, although he does so out of good intentions. Once in a while he is seen scolding Irwin when he thinks Irwin did something disrespectful or rude, but is more often seen doing something nice with Irwin like going to a baseball game or on a picnic.
 Judith "Judy" Lockin' Dracula is Irwin's mummy mother and wife of human/vampire Richard Dracula. Since Judy is undead, she lives in the basement (resembling an  Egyptian basement).
 Tanya "Grand-mama" Dracula (voiced by Phil LaMarr) is Dick's mother and Irwin's paternal grandmother. She usually ends sentences with "baby", as Irwin does with "yo" and his father with "dude", which seems to be suggesting a family trait. She is also Dracula's wife. Despite her angry demeanor, she seems to care for Irwin, but will sometimes embarrass him. She doesn't like to be challenged or insulted and has a hatred of hip hop music. She seems to have grown up in The Dozens, as she has a mastery of "yo mama" jokes. In "Dracula Must Die!", it is revealed that when she was young, Tanya was a very lovely young woman who could really kick-butt with karate and that she married Dracula because he was a great dancer despite him being a blood-sucking vampire.
 Lord Dracula (voiced by Phil LaMarr) is a vampire that was Grim's childhood hero who has normal ears and is the biological father of Dick and therefore is Irwin's grandpa. Dracula talks in the third-person. He is a selfish old man that calls Grim "Skeleton-Man" or "Big Dummy". He gets angry at people for wanting to do things for him. He always wants people to see him dance. When he danced for Tanya she instantly fell in love with him, but he ran away from her when she beat him up, thinking he was a bat. Dracula's appearance and mannerisms are patterned after the blaxploitation movies of the early 70's, most notably Blacula while also taking inspiration from Fred G. Sanford of Sanford & Son.

School members 
 Mindy (voiced by Rachael MacFarlane) is the queen bee of the school attended by all of the child characters featured in the program (and is always shown in her school clothes regardless of being outside of school). Mindy shares a rivalry with Mandy, whom she looks down upon and considers to be unattractive and inferior in comparison with her. Being very self-important, Mindy snubs her peers and possesses a powerful competitive edge. This could perhaps be credited with her combined strong desire to top those who she perceives as inferior and her love of winning. This is seen in one episode, where a possible main reason for wanting to win a local child beauty pageant appeared to be her desire to prove herself lovelier than Mandy who was a fellow contestant in the pageant. Mindy seems to be pampered by her unseen father, the benefactor who she credits with giving her expensive, high-quality presents and material gifts. Her mother is her only parent to make an appearance in the series. Albeit she seems to support her overindulged and snobby daughter, Mindy was seen tearfully lamenting in one episode that her mother did not love her, but her reasons for feeling this way are unknown.
 Sperg (voiced by Greg Eagles) is the local bully, who picks on Billy, Irwin, Pud'n, and other kids to no end. He is a husky boy whose preferred method of terrorizing other kids is by administering his lethal wedgies. Despite his physical strength, he is frightened of Mandy because of her toughness and cynical attitude. On his shoulder, he has a heart tattoo that says "Mom" and in "Ecto Cooler" is shown to become furious when Billy reads a poem about Sperg's mother being so ugly that it can cause people's faces to melt. Ironically, Sperg's mother is shown to actually be a highly attractive woman with dark hair and a more realistic face than other characters, however, Principal Goodvibes' face does in fact melt when he sees her, though it is implied that this is due to her attractiveness. She is shown to be quite sensitive about her appearance as she is driven to tears by the cruel words in Billy's poem, which further enrages Sperg, showing that he really loves his mother. Like his mother, Sperg tends to be very emotionally sensitive, though he tends to keep this side of him under wraps, to maintain his image as a bully. He has dreams of moving to New York City and having a career on Broadway when he grows up.
 Pud'n (voiced by Jane Carr) A weak and easily frightened classmate of Billy, Mandy, and Irwin, Pud'n is often the victim and/or sometimes the instigator of some traumatic event. He is a red-headed, freckled boy with buck teeth and a hoodie. Supposedly, he has no parents, but was raised by wolves. However, he lives in a house and is a next-door neighbor and a good friend of Billy. Pud'n loves dolls, bunnies and flowers. At times, Pud'n can also be a terrifying force and show his dark side. Pud'n shows a fear of toilets and became even more scared when discovered skeleton's bones in one. He has also been known to have an allergy to pies, which causes his face to swell up. In one episode, it is revealed that Pud'n thinks that General Skarr has the prettiest lawn on the whole block, but later reveals a powerful hatred for Skarr himself due to an earlier event in the episode involving Grim causing trouble and turning Pud'n's bunny friends into big, huge scary-looking monsters. He later takes his anger out on Skarr because he believed that Skarr was the one who did it.
 Ms. Eleanor Butterbean (voiced by Renee Raudman) is Billy and Mandy's uncaring teacher. She often takes naps in class on her desk and detests her job as a teacher. While she is mean to everyone, in a few episodes, she is slightly more sensitive, as one time she changes Billy's F to an A, causing the universe to turn inside out, causing her to act like this alter ego of hers. In the episode where the bus broke down in the desert, despite the extreme heat, she had them dig while she sat in the shade of an umbrella and drank lemonade.
 Principal Goodvibes (voiced by Chris Cox) is the Paul Lynde-esque principal of Billy and Mandy's school. His name was legally changed to Goodvibes, and he makes sure that his students feel good to the point of absurdity. It is later revealed in one episode that he sleeps in his car (though in another, he was shown to live in an apartment). He also bears a rather uncanny resemblance to politician Ron Paul, in both appearance and speech, who may have also influenced the character. He appears to be on good terms with Mandy, being one of the few authority figures that she does not directly disrespect. In Billy & Mandy: Wrath of the Spider Queen, at the end of the movie, he was captured by the spider army. It's unknown what happened to him after this.

Underworld and Supernatural 
 Eris (voiced by Rachael MacFarlane) based on the Greek deity of the same name, is the personification of strife portrayed as a curvaceous and beautiful but vindictive blonde woman with a gap in her teeth. She delights in causing all kinds of chaos and does a multitude of destructive things. She possesses the powerful Apple of Discord, a golden apple which can transform into any shape to perpetuate chaos (though Billy calls it a "magic banana"). Her accent and behavior are prone to sudden shifts, from a stereotypical valley girl to a refined British woman, parodying Madonna's change in image over the years. It is revealed in "Wrath of the Spider Queen" that Eris attended the same school as Grim, Velma, Nergal, Lord Pain, and Boogey. Grim used to have a crush on her during earlier episodes, but later changes his mind, claiming her to be a "psychopath." She is also in love with Hoss Delgado. After her rupture with Hoss, the scrapped characters Nice Eris & Naughty Eris were created. They were set to appear in the unmade Underfist: The Series.
 Jeff the Spider (voiced by Maxwell Atoms) is a giant anthropomorphic spider who thinks Billy is his father. When Billy opens Grim's magical trunk one day, he finds an egg, which he incubates himself and raises. When it hatches, Jeff appears and believes Billy is his father. Unfailingly friendly, caring, and kind, Jeff wants more than anything to gain Billy's fatherly love despite Billy's arachnophobia-based fear and hatred for him. Billy frequently beats him with blunt objects. Jeff blames himself for Billy's hatred toward him and constantly tries to win his fatherly love and affection. With Mandy's help, he finally manages to scare Billy into loving him. In the episode called Spider-Mandy the sickness that Billy contracts from Jeff turns Mandy into huge spider-like creature and when Jeff sees her like this, he thinks that she's his mommy. The toxins that Jeff's fangs produce help to turn Mandy back into her old-self. At one point, Jeff rejects Billy when he refuses to love his "son", but it just turns out the spider was possessed by a cow-spider demon. Jeff was engaged to Grim's ex-best friend Velma Green the Spider Queen in Billy and Mandy: Wrath of the Spider Queen.
 The Boogeyman (voiced by Fred Willard) is the dead king of boogey men, an old arch-enemy of Grim's since junior high school and a former bully. He played pranks on Grim throughout his school career (one such prank involved publicly humiliating Grim in front of the whole class by giving him a nuclear wedgie from off-stage whilst Grim was reciting a scene from Hamlet; Grim never lived that incident down since everyone called him "Wedgie Shakespeare" afterwards). Boogey is, in fact, the Boogeyman himself, and can shapeshift in order to scare people. Boogey is Grim's rival in scaring people but usually fails in doing so. Being constantly frustrated by his inability to scare modern-day children (he blames cartoons, video games and for some reason, the tuba), Boogey visits Grim in the episode Bully Boogie. Mandy suggests a challenge of a scaring contest, which Boogey promptly loses, and is banished to the Pit of Terror/Nightmare Realm. Ironically, it is the same dimension to which he sent Billy, one filled with spiny plants and a creature similar to the plants.
 Judge Roy Spleen (voiced by Phil LaMarr) is the judge of the Underworld Court. He and the whole Underworld Court first appeared briefly in the episode "Home of the Ancients", but had a greater role in the episode "Keeper of the Reaper". He is also seen in Billy & Mandy: Wrath of the Spider Queen as Grim's school teacher and officiated Jeff's wedding in the same film. He hates Fred Fredburger, who pestered him constantly during "Keeper of the Reaper". He also was the court judge in Billy & Mandy's Big Boogey Adventure. He, in "Keeper", paternally allowed both Billy and Mandy have Grim on the condition that Billy doesn't leave his house for one week. His name is a pun on legendary Old West Judge Roy Bean.
 Fred Fredburger (voiced by C. H. Greenblatt) is a dimwitted, pale green, bipedal furry otherworldly creature resembling an elephant with stubby horns and the tail of a devil. He is depicted as being generally idiotic, infantile, and harmless; he dwells on subjects such as his recent defecation, small facts about himself, and spelling his own name aloud. He debuted in the episode "Keeper of the Reaper" presiding on the court case between Billy and Mandy regarding the Grim Reaper's custody due to Billy's upcoming move, where he frequently disrupted the trial with his idiocy and childish behavior which was enough to make even Billy pause. He would later appear in a different episode as the winner of a competition, being rewarded with a day spent with Grim that wound up ending poorly (with Fred being cast into the arctic). Aside from this, Fred has been shown to harbor an adoration of frozen yogurt and especially nachos, and wound up overtaking the future as a powerful overlord. His catchphrase is the word, "yes" and he also has a tendency to blurt out his own name at random times, including chanting it repeatedly during the court case.
 Bun Bun (voiced by David Wittenberg) is a marshmallow rabbit and the main antagonist of the Halloween special Underfist: Halloween Bash. In this movie, he leads a candy army to take over the Surface with the help of Mindy in her witch form.

Recurring characters

General Skarr 
General Reginald Peter Skarr first appeared in the show Evil Con Carne, where he was Hector Con Carne's paramilitary commander. He heavily despised Hector's rule and wants to become ruler himself in many attempts. One such attempt was seen in the segment Day of the Dreadbot where he takes control of Hector's robotic army and makes a robot version of himself to follow him at all costs. However, Skarrbot betrayed him to Skarr's joy. His design is based on Fearless Leader.

After "Evil Con Carne" was canceled, Skarr became a recurring character in The Grim Adventures of Billy & Mandy as a neighbor who wants to go his own ways. He is usually a cold-hearted, hateful, and harsh man, with big interests in power and world domination. He speaks in a British accent, and is blind in his left eye, and has a scar beneath it, giving Billy the assumption that he is a pirate. Retired from villainy, due to Evil Con Carne being bought out by a big entertainment corporation (who didn't want any competition for their attempts at world domination), he moves into Billy and Mandy's neighborhood and is constantly struggling with the temptation to return to his evil ways. He attempts to distract himself and channel his hunger for power, usually by gardening. Whilst he is no longer a member of Evil Con Carne, Skarr has many weapons and mementos from his past which he stores in his private study. Among these are his military outfit and a large picture of himself with Hector and Ghastly. In Underfist: Halloween Bash, he has grown facial hair.

Hoss Delgado 
Hoss (voiced by Diedrich Bader) is a 33-year-old spectral exterminator; a hunter of paranormal creatures. He possesses one real hand and a mechanical one, the latter of which can seemingly produce any tool he desires, most commonly a metal fist or a chainsaw-launching crossbow. He is the take-no-prisoner figure from the show, though in most episodes he acts in a clumsy and/or goofy manner. For a while he dated Eris, and their relationship was very dysfunctional. Hoss is known to make incredibly odd and usually completely irrelevant metaphors, often when talking to someone who is either cowardly or stupid. Similarly, he uses exclamatory phrases which are different, but recognizable from their original form. In his first appearances he distrusts Grim, but this dissipates as the series progresses. He resembles Kurt Russell's character Snake Plissken from Escape from New York and his chainsaw hand is inspired by Ash Williams from the Evil Dead series. His name is a parody of Jose Delgado, also known as Gangbuster in the DC Comics continuity. He is madly head-over-heels in love with Eris.

Toadblatt's School 
 Nigel Planter (voiced by Jake Thomas), a spoof of Harry Potter, is a boy with glasses and an "L"-shaped scar on his forehead (revealed to be a pen mark). He's a young whiny wizard from Weaselthorpe House at Toadblatt's School of Sorcery. He is often overconfident and holds a deluded self-image, often taking credit for things he did not do (like Mandy's sabotage of rival house Gunderstank's efforts of winning the house championship). Later in the series, it is implied that he holds mild romantic affections for Mandy. In the episode Order of the Peanuts, it was stated that Nigel was the last heir to the Planters Peanuts Company, giving an explanation to his terrible track record as a wizard.
 Dean Toadblatt (voiced by John Vernon, later Ronnie Schell (for Order of the Peanuts)) is the headmaster of Toadblatt's School of Sorcery, and a spoof of Albus Dumbledore (and Severus Snape). Toadblatt is a large, humanoid toad wearing a purple wizard's robe. He hates Nigel Planter with a passion, and goes to various lengths to remove him from his school. After John Vernon's passing, Toadblatt's voice and entire character design was entirely changed for the next cartoon. Only one character noticed the change, and was dragged away to an unknown end. This was a parody of the fact that two actors portrayed Albus Dumbledore in the Harry Potter films (when Richard Harris died, the role went to Michael Gambon).
 Lord Moldybutt (voiced by John Kassir), a spoof of Harry Potter villain Lord Voldemort. He is first mentioned in "The Chamber Pot of Secrets", and is believed to be out to kill Nigel. At the end of the episode, it is revealed that it was Toadblatt in disguise who wanted to get rid of Nigel. Later, in "The Order of the Peanuts", the real Lord Moldybutt reveals that he is not out to kill Nigel, but he is a real estate attorney and wishes to sign over the Planter's peanut farm left to Nigel from his dead parents. He gave Nigel an L-shaped pen mark (which Nigel thought to be a scar) when he was young, referring to Harry Potter's lightning scar. Saying Lord Moldybutt's name causes things to break, even if said by Moldybutt himself. In consequence, people call him "he-who-should-never-ever-be-named". However, many characters, especially Billy, carelessly say his name with disastrous consequences.
 Squidhat (voiced by "Weird Al" Yankovic), A squid used by Toadblatt to allocate his new students to the school's various houses, in homage to the Sorting Hat from Harry Potter. He also appears to be a singer and guitarist. He makes his first appearance in "Toadblatt's School of Sorcery". After sending the first three students to Gunderstank, he sends Billy and Mandy (who threatens him that, should he touch her, she'll "in the mood for calamari") to Weaselthorp.

Minor characters

Lord Pain 
Lord Pain (voiced by Henry Gibson) is the ruler of a realm known as the Plane of Eternal Suffering. His head is covered by a spiked helmet, obscuring his eyes; and he wields a large mace and shield. He swears eternal and single-minded loyalty to his chosen master, tattooing their image on his body along with anything else he feels particularly passionate about. He first appears in "House of Pain", declaring himself to be Grim's servant, and attempts to kill the kids to free Grim, but ends up taking Mandy as his new master instead. In "Everything Breaks", he brings Billy with him to the Plane of Eternal Suffering on Mandy's orders to help cure him of his destructive habits. According to Wrath of the Spider Queen, he formerly attended Junior High alongside many of the other characters.

Cerberus 
Cerberus is Grim's pet demon dog from the Underworld (Voiced by Jess Harnell, Greg Eagles and Danny Mann), with two heads of a doberman and one of a poodle. He however has no control of him whatsoever, which often terrifies him. But as Billy and Mandy love their pets, Grim loves him.

Mr. Snuggles 
Mr. Snuggles is Billy's elderly pet hamster (voiced by Richard Horvitz) who is seven years old ("like a jillion in hamster years", Billy claims). He is the exact reason why Grim became Billy and Mandy's friend. He appeared in the pilot, "Meet the Reaper". In one episode of the series, Mr. Snuggles saved Milkshakes, but Milkshakes eats him anyway. Near the end of that same episode, Mr. Snuggles escapes by breaking Milkshakes' teeth, followed immediately by a fourth wall break courtesy of Billy saying, "What? You didn't think we'd let Mr. Snuggles get eaten, did you?" Mr. Snuggles has brown fur and black spots on his back.

Jack O'Lantern 
Jack O'Lantern (voiced by Wayne Knight in the series; Maurice LaMarche in the video game) is the main antagonist of "Billy & Mandy's Jacked Up Halloween". A prankster from the medieval era, the people of Endsville grew tired of his pranks and framed him for a crime, for which he was executed. When Grim came to reap his soul, he managed to steal Grim's scythe, demanding immortality in exchange for it. Grim agreed, but decapitated Jack in retribution, forcing him to replace it with a pumpkin and leading to his ostracization by society. In the present, Jack tricks Billy into stealing Grim's scythe for him, which he uses to bring pumpkins to life in an attempt to take over Endsville and get revenge on Grim. He is ultimately defeated on accident by Irwin before Grim banishes him to the Underworld.

Chippy the Squirrel 
Chippy the Squirrel (voiced by Richard Horvitz)

Chippy Squirrel is a character in The Grim Adventure of Billy and Mandy movie Billy and Mandy’s Big Boogey Adventures. In “Billy and Mandy’s Big Boogey Adventures, he with gathered acorns ran over by Skarr’s car, his is interuped to Grim’s sword cut in half, he got chopped in half.

Movies
 Billy and Mandy’s Big Boogey Adventures (cameo only appearance)

Categories: Characters The Grim Adventures of Billy & Mandy characters One-Time Characters

Evil Con Carne

Main characters 
Hector Con Carne was a billionaire Mexican playboy who wanted to dominate the world. One day, he decided to hire a mad scientist. He hired a nurse who is actually a bomb made by Cod Commando to blow up his mansion and body. Only his brain and stomach lived. Hector was surprised that he was reduced to two organs. He stayed as a brain for seven years since the explosion. Hector is very irritable towards his failed attempts to rule the world. In "The Smell of Vengeance", Hector is afraid of germs since they can kill him as a brain. Hector lives inside a jar filled with antiseptic.Major Doctor Andedonia J. Ghastly is the lover and mad scientist of Evil Con Carne. She used to be the second assistant to Professor Death Ray Eyes and decided to apply for Hector Con Carne. She instantly fell in love with Hector for seven years. Ghastly is the most optimistic of the crew since she would rather let her love towards Hector bloom instead of helping Hector achieve his goal of world domination.Boskov is a Russian circus bear who was owned by Vlad, the ringmaster of a Russian circus. He was picked by Major Doctor Ghastly to carry both Hector Con Carne's brain and stomach. Even though Hector's brain controls most of Boskov, he wants to eat honey and resist Hector's commands. Boskov usually gets picked on by Hector. Boskov's design is inspired by Yogi Bear in the first three seasons, and by season four, had a Stimpy-esque redesign.Stomach is the stomach of Hector Con Carne. He is very gassy and only talks when food is discussed. In the segment "Gutless", Stomach was sick and Hector left him behind so he can invade Buckingham Palace. The invasion did not work since Hector decided to help Stomach instead.

Recurring characters 

 Cod Commando (voiced by Maxwell Atoms, Robert Picardo (singing voice in "The Pie Who Loved Me")) is a cod fish who works for SPORK and is Hector Con Carne's arch-nemesis, and is directly responsible for reducing him to a brain and stomach. He only speaks through "blah blah blah" and can be translated from different people such as Ghastly and Ensign Slaughter. Hector Con Carne hated Cod Commando more than life itself, as confirmed in "The Smell of Vengeance".
 Estroy (voiced by Maurice LaMarche) is Hector Con Carne's rival into dominating the world. His voice and mannerisms are based on Frank Nelson and is a spoof of the G.I. Joe character Destro. Estroy uses more hostile ways to take over the world compared to Hector and wears a metal mask to hide his beautiful face. He also has two sons.
 Destructicus Con Carne (voiced by Rino Romano) is the future son of Hector Con Carne and Major Doctor Ghastly, even though it is not known how he was conceived. Unlike his father, he would use his abilities for good, to which he would often fight against Hector's army. Nonetheless, he still loves his parents, though Ghastly is the only one who would return his affections. He first appeared in "The Time Hole Incident" as both a baby and an adult who warns Hector and his allies about the dangers of time travel. His second and final appearance in "Son of Evil" shows that Destructicus can reverse engineer his father's technology for good instead of Hector.
 Enrique Jr. (voiced by Frank Welker, Dee Bradley Baker (Ultimate Evil only)) is Hector Con Carne's pet chihuahua and is Ghastly's favorite pet. In "Emotional Skarr", Ghastly and Hector built a robot based on Enrique Jr. to take over the world for Skarr, but accidentally self-destructed himself. In "Ultimate Evil", Ghastly told Enrique Jr. to speak Spanish with the phrase "¡Yo quiero Hector Con Carne!", which is a direct spoof of the Taco Bell chihuahua.
 Abraham Lincoln (voiced by Peter Renaday) is the unexplained president of the United States of America and a member of the League of Nations. He also commands S.P.O.R.K. for helping him stop Hector Con Carne's evil schemes.

Minor characters 
 Professor Death Ray Eyes (voiced by Maxwell Atoms) used to have Ghastly as his second assistant before she decided to work for Hector, as a drawing in "'"Tiptoe Through The Tulips"'". He made his only appearance in "League of Destruction", where he and the other villains argued who should lead the League, which ultimately dissolved the faction.

Appearing in Underfist 
 Bun Bun (voiced by Dave Wittenberg) is a marshmallow bunny and the main antagonist.

References 

Cartoon Network Studios characters
Lists of characters in American television animation
The Grim Adventures of Billy & Mandy
Television characters introduced in 1999
Animated characters introduced in 1999